The Aldabra brush warbler (Nesillas aldabrana) is an extinct bird in the acrocephalid warbler family. It was endemic to the atoll of Aldabra in the Seychelles and an individual was last seen in 1983.

Description
The Aldabra brush warbler was a slender bird with relatively short wings and a long, pointed tail. The upper parts were dun and the underparts a rather paler hue. The song was never recorded but the call was a nasal, three-syllable chirrup.

Ecology
The Aldabra brush warbler was a shy and retiring bird, difficult to observe in the dense undergrowth in which it lived. It was most readily located by its chirruping call.

Discovery and extinction
The Aldabra brush warbler was discovered by British ornithologists Constantine Walter Benson, Malcolm Penny and Tony Diamond in 1967 and described in 1968 by Benson and Penny on the basis of a male, a female and a nest with 3 eggs. Juveniles were never found.

After the discovery the brush warbler was not seen until a survey by Robert Prys-Jones of the British Museum of Natural History from 1974 to 1976. At the end of 1975 he found six further birds which were all males. The birds were ringed and photographed. In 1983, only one male was observed and the Aldabra brush warbler was considered as the rarest and (in its occurrence) most restricted bird in the world. It was confined to a 10 ha large coastal strip on the Aldabran island of Malabar. Following intensive surveys, the extinction of this bird was confirmed in 1986. It has been listed as officially extinct by the IUCN since 1994.

The possible reasons for its extinction could be attributed to the presence of rats, cats and goats introduced to the atoll many years previously.

References

 Errol Fuller "Extinct Birds". 2000.  (with a photograph of a living individual)
Del Hoyo, J.; Elliot, A. & Christie D. (editors): Handbook of the Birds of the World. Volume 11: Old World Flycatchers to Old World Warblers. Lynx Edicions 2006, .

External links
Some Observations on Nesillas aldabranus

Nesillas
Birds of Seychelles
Bird extinctions since 1500
Birds described in 1968
Endemic fauna of Seychelles
Extinct birds of Indian Ocean islands
Taxa named by Constantine Walter Benson